The Stone Boy is a 1984 American drama film directed by Christopher Cain and starring Robert Duvall, Frederic Forrest, Glenn Close, Wilford Brimley, Linda Hamilton, Dean Cain and Jason Presson. It is based on the 1957 short story "The Stone Boy" by American author Gina Berriault.

Plot
The Hillerman family copes with the aftermath of the death of one of their children in a hunting accident.

Cast
 Robert Duvall 	... Joe Hillerman  
 Jason Presson 	... Arnold Hillerman  
 Glenn Close 	... Ruth Hillerman  
 Susan Blackstone 	... Nora Hillerman 
 Dean Cain 	... Eugene Hillerman  
 Frederic Forrest 	... Andy Jansen  
 Cindy Fisher ... Amalie  
 Gail Youngs 	... Lu Jansen  
 Wilford Brimley 	... George Jansen  
 Mary Ellen Trainor ... Doris Simms 
 Linda Hamilton	... Eva Crescent Moon Lady 
 Tom Waits	        ... Petrified man at carnival (cameo)

Production
Principal photography began on June 28, 1983. Filming took place in and around the area of Cascade, Montana where the Hillerman farm is located. The Hillerman Ranch had been abandoned for years, so the crew had to paint, furnish the house and groom the yard before production began.

Filming was also conducted in the town of Cascade, including at Hillside Cemetery, Cascade's Sportsman's Club, and the local park for a carnival sequence. More than 200 local area residents were hired for stand ins and speaking roles. Next they traveled to Great Falls, Montana to begin filming in the city, at a local truck stop just north of town, the bus station, and a saloon. Reshoots were frequently required because of problems and delays. Production wrapped in late July and early August 1983.

Release
The Stone Boy was released on April 4, 1984 in New York and in select cities. It was pulled from movie theaters after a week. It grossed $261,033 in its run.

Reception
On Rotten Tomatoes, it has an approval rating of 67% based on reviews from 6 critics, with an average of 6.5/10.

Home media
The Stone Boy was released on video by CBS Fox Video. The DVD was released by Anchor Bay on May 17, 2005.

References

External links
 
 

1984 films
1984 drama films
American drama films
Films scored by James Horner
Films about families
Films based on short fiction
Films produced by Joe Roth
Films shot in Montana
20th Century Fox films
Films directed by Christopher Cain
1980s English-language films
1980s American films